Behemoth: Or the Game of God is a 2020 Mosotho action–mystery short film directed by Lemohang Jeremiah Mosese and co-produced by Hannah Stockmann. The film stars Tseko Monaheng as 'Preacher' in the lead role.

The film received critical reviews from critics and screened at several international film festivals.

Cast
 Tseko Monaheng as Preacher

International screenings
 Clermont-Ferrand International Short Film Festival, France – 6 February 2016 
 African Film Festival AfryKamera, Poland – 23 April 2016	
 Tenerife Shorts, Spain – 10 September 2016	
 L'Étrange Festival, France – 10 September 2016

References

External links
 
 
 Behemoth: Or the Game of God

2016 films
Lesotho short films
2016 short films